Kangen (寛元) is a Japanese era name for the years spanning 1243 through 1247.

Kangen may also refer to:

 Kangen (music) (管弦), a Japanese term used for gagaku concert music for wind, string and percussion instruments